Sveriges Medeltida Ballader (SMB) is a scholarly edition which compiles, in principle, all of the known Swedish medieval (traditional) ballads in existence, including those from Swedish-speaking parts of Finland.

The ballads are cross referenced to the corresponding TSB number (The Types of the Scandinavian Medieval Ballad). Not only that, the SMB numbers were assigned in the order of ascending TSB type numbers, i.e., SMB 1 was assigned to TSB A 4, ending with SMB 260 assigned to F 75, at the point in time when 260 ballad types were recognized in the collection. But 263 types were given in the final count when the 5th volume was published 2001. (See §Contents of the published volumes).

For each ballad type in the collection, all variants in full text have been printed, up to a maximum of 25 variants, arranged chronologically (This means that for about 80% of the types, all known variants are exhaustively printed, while for the 20% remaining, only a listing of the variants are given beyond the 25 variants limit).

Another feature of SMB is that the accompanying melodies have been comprehensively printed alongside the text, unlike ballad collections in some of the other languages.

In 2005, a ballad collection was discovered in the library of Växjö that contained ballad types not enumerated in the SMB.

Contents of the published volumes 
Band 1 (1983): Naturmytisk visa  (SMB 1-36)
Band 2 (1986): Legendvisa  (SMB 37-54); Historisk visa  (SMB 55-65)
Band 3 (1990): Riddarvisa  I (SMB 66-130)
Band 4:1 (1996): Riddarvisa II (SMB 131-169)
Band 4:2 (1997): Riddarvisa III (SMB 170-196)
Band 5:1 (2001) Kämpavisa  (SMB 197-219); Skämtvisa  I (SMB 220-233)
Band 5:2 (2001) Skämtvisa II (SMB 234-263)

See also 
  GA = Geijer and Afzelius, Svenska folk-visor från forntiden (1814–1816) – pioneering Swedish ballad collection.
  SF =,  (1834) – another early Swedish compilation.
List of folk song collections
Danmarks gamle folkeviser – Danish folk ballad compilation
Francis J. Child's The English and Scottish Popular Ballads – Compilation of traditional ballads in English.

Footnotes

Explanatory notes

Citations

References 

 (Review)

 (Review)

External links 
Searchable index at Svenskt visarkiv 

Sweden